Devaru Kotta Thangi is a 2009 Indian Kannada-language film, directed by Om Sai Prakash. The film stars Shiva Rajkumar and Meera Jasmine, with Monica and Suraj.

Cast
Shiva Rajkumar as Shivu 
Meera Jasmine as Lakshmi, Shivu's Sister
Monica as Gowri, Shivu's Love interest 
Suraj Lokre as Shekhar 
Avinash as Veerabhadragowda 
Hema Chaudhary
Sumithra
Ramesh Bhat
Sadhu Kokila
M. N. Lakshmi Devi
 Rekha Kumar
Sangeetha
Vasu
 Ramesh Pandith
Karibasavaiah
Biradar
Ramanand

Production 
The makers of the film wanted Radhika, who played Shiva Rajkumar's sister in Thavarige Baa Thangi (2002) and Anna Thangi (2005) to play his sister in this film. However, she was unable to play the role because she had quit films. Malayalam actress Meera Jasmine was brought in as her replacement, marking her return to Kannada cinema.

Soundtrack
The music was composed by Hamsalekha.

Reception
A critic from The Times of India wrote that "It's Shivarajkumar's show all the way. The ace actor, with his brilliant acting, brings to life an otherwise dull film". A critic from Sify wrote that "The commercial elements and sentiments are in over dose and if the film needs urgent trimming. The graphic update is very well synchronized in the film, where the lead actors have scored". A critic from Rediff.com wrote that "The movie could have been better but for the cliched formulaic story, regressive posturing and dragging narration".

References

2009 films
2000s Kannada-language films
Indian drama films
Films scored by Hamsalekha
Films directed by Sai Prakash